Peribasis pubicollis is a species of beetle in the family Cerambycidae. It was described by Francis Polkinghorne Pascoe in 1866. It is known from Singapore, Borneo, Bhutan and Malaysia.

References

Lamiini
Beetles described in 1866